Garage Rock! – A Collection of Lost Songs From 1996–1998 is a compilation album by Canadian rock band Danko Jones. It was released on April 8, 2014.

Track listing
 "Who Got It?" – 2:00
 "Make You Mine" – 1:37
 "I'm Your Man" – 2:21
 "She's Got a Bomb" – 2:15
 "Rock and Roll Is Black and Blue" – 1:28
 "Dirty Mind Too" – 0:52
 "I'm Drinking Alcohol?" – 2:06
 "Love Travel" (demo) – 3:02
 "Bounce" (demo) – 2:24
 "Sexual Interlude" – 1:21
 "I Stand Accused" – 3:15
 "Best Good Looking Girl in Town" – 1:47
 "Payback" – 1:19
 "Lowdown" – 2:04
 "One Night Stand" – 1:40
 "Instrumental" – 1:44
 "Move On" (Live in Washington, DC @ The Black Cat on May 23, 1998) – 5:54

References

Danko Jones albums
2009 greatest hits albums